Somerset Football Club, also known as the "Sharks", is a soccer club which represents Somerset in the Tasmanian Northern Championship.  The club also fields teams in all junior divisions, as well as women's teams. Somerset play their home games at Somerset Recreation Ground, in Somerset, Tasmania.

Somerset Football Club was formed in 1979 by a dedicated soccer player known as Nigel Brown. He wanted to create a club for the Somerset and Wynyard area. They began their life playing home games at Wynyard High School, before relocating to the Somerset Recreation Ground (Shark Park).

In 2006 Somerset won the Tasmanian Championship for the first time, having already won the Northern Premier League title. They have subsequently won the Northern Premier League again on seven occasions.

Honours
State Championship: 2006
Northern Championship:  2006; 2007; 2013; 2014; 2015; 2016; 2017; 2021

External links
 Official Website

Association football clubs established in 1979
Soccer clubs in Tasmania
1979 establishments in Australia